Athletics records comprise the best performances in the sports of track and field, road running, racewalking and combined events. There are two different kinds of athletics records in Malaysia and certified by the Malaysia Athletics Federation (MAF):
 National record, more commonly referred to in Malaysia as the rekod kebangsaan: the best result recorded anywhere in the world by an athlete or team holding Malaysian citizenship.
 Malaysian All-Comers record: the best result recorded within Malaysia by an athlete or team regardless of nationality.

Key to tables:

Legend:
h = hand timing; m/s = meter per second; + = en route to a longer distance; A = affected by altitude; OT = oversized track (> 200m in circumference); NWI = no wind information

Current Malaysian national records

Outdoor

Men

Women

Indoor

Men

Women

Under-23
National under-23 records in athletics comprise the best performance of an athlete before the year of their 23rd birthday. Technically, in all under-23 athletics age divisions, the age is calculated "on December 31 of the year of competition" to avoid age group switching during a competitive season.

Men

Women

Junior (under-20)
National junior records in athletics comprise the best performance of an athlete before the year of their 20th birthday. Technically, in all under 20 age divisions, the age is calculated "on December 31 of the year of competition" to avoid age group switching during a competitive season.

Men

Women

Youth (under-18)
Malaysian youth bests in the sport of athletics are the all-time best marks set in competition by aged 17 or younger throughout the entire calendar year of the performance and competing as Malaysian citizen. MAF doesn't maintain an official list for such performances. All bests shown on this list are tracked by statisticians not officially sanctioned by the governing body.

Boys

Girls

Current Malaysian All-Comers records

Men

Women

Notes

References
General
World Athletics Statistic Handbook 2022: National Outdoor Records
World Athletics Statistic Handbook 2022: National Indoor Records
Specific

External links
MAF official website

Records
Malaysia
Athletics Records
Athletics